Worm, Worms or de Worms is a surname.  People with the surname include:

Worm
 Alfred Worm (1945–2007), Austrian investigative journalist, author and professor
 Boris Worm (born 1969), marine ecologist 
Christen Worm (1672–1737), Danish bishop 
 Erik Worm (1900-1962), Danish tennis player
 Ole Worm (1588–1655), Danish physician
 Ronald Worm (born 1953), German footballer
 Rutger Worm (born 1986), Dutch footballer
 Siri Worm (born 1992), Dutch footballer

Worms or de Worms
 Solomon Benedict de Worms, 1st Baron de Worms (1801–1882), Austrian aristocrat, plantation owner in Ceylon, and stockbroker in London
 George de Worms, 2nd Baron de Worms (1829-1902), Austrian aristocrat and English public official and banker; son of the above
 Anthony Denis Maurice George de Worms, 3rd Baron de Worms (1869-1938), Austrian aristocrat and English philatelist, son of George de Worms
 Charles de Worms (1903–1979), English chemist and lepidopterist, son of Anthony de Worms
 Percy de Worms (1873–1941), English aristocrat and philatelist, son of George de Worms
 Maurice Benedict de Worms (1805-1867), Austrian plantation owner in Ceylon, brother of Solomon de Worms
 Worms family, a European Jewish family 
 Henry de Worms, 1st Baron Pirbright (1840-1903), British politician
 René Worms (1869-1926), a French auditor of the council of state
 Aaron Worms (1754-1836), chief rabbi of Metz and a Talmudist
Ernest Ailred Worms (1891-1963), German missionary and linguist in Australian Indigenous languages
 Jean Worms (1884–1943), French film actor
 Jules Worms (1832–1924), French painter